Bitstamp is a cryptocurrency exchange based in Luxembourg. It allows trading between fiat currency, bitcoin and other cryptocurrencies. It allows USD, EUR, GBP, bitcoin, ALGO, XRP, Ether, litecoin, bitcoin cash, XLM, Link, OMG Network, USD Coin or PAX deposits and withdrawals.

The company was founded as a European-focused alternative to then-dominant bitcoin exchange Mt. Gox. While the company trades in US dollars, it accepts fiat money deposits for free only via the European Union's Single Euro Payments Area, a mechanism for transferring money between European bank accounts.

History 

The company is headed by CEO Nejc Kodrič, a widely known member of the bitcoin community, who co-founded the company in August 2011 with Damijan Merlak in his native Slovenia, but later moved its registration to the UK in April 2013, then to Luxembourg in 2016. Bitstamp outsourced certain operations to the UK due to the lack of adequate financial and legal services in Slovenia.

When incorporating in the United Kingdom, the company approached the UK's Financial Conduct Authority for guidance, but was told that bitcoin was not classed as a currency, so the exchange was not subject to regulation. Bitstamp says that it instead regulates itself, following a set of best practices to authenticate customers and deter money laundering. In September 2013, the company began requiring account holders to verify their identity with copies of their passports and official records of their home address.

In April 2016, the Luxembourgish government granted a license to Bitstamp to be fully regulated in the EU as a payment institution, allowing it to do business in all 28 EU member states.

In April 2018, Nexon was rumored to be in talks to purchase Bitstamp.

Service disruptions 
In February 2014, the company suspended withdrawals for several days in the face of a distributed denial-of-service. Bitcoin Magazine reported that people behind the attack sent a ransom demand of 75 bitcoins to Kodrič, who refused due to a company policy against negotiating with “terrorists”.

In January 2015, Bitstamp suspended its service after a hack during which less than 19,000 bitcoins were stolen, reopening nearly a week later.

Compliance 
In September 2018 the New York Attorney General office produced a 42-page "Virtual Markets Integrity Initiative Report" after requesting fourteen virtual currency exchanges to participate in a survey. The report aimed to create greater transparency regarding security, anti-hacking measures and business practices. Bitstamp was among ten platforms that responded; it is noted that of these ten, Bitstamp was among the seven that confirmed that they had sought approval, directly or through a subsidiary, from the New York State Department of Financial Services (“DFS”) to operate a virtual currency business in New York State. The report goes on to say that such approval implies an agreement to actively protect deposited funds, prevent money laundering and illegal activity, and respond to other risks. Bitstamp was one of two exchanges that claimed to block access to their exchange by VPNs. In addition to providing fee policies, Bitstamp also claimed to conduct audits of their virtual currency holdings.

Notes

References 

Bitcoin exchanges
Privately held companies of the United Kingdom
2011 establishments in the United Kingdom
Financial services companies established in 2011
Bitcoin
Cryptocurrency theft
Bitcoin companies
Digital currency exchanges